Oru Adaar Love is a 2019 Malayalam-language romantic comedy film. The screenplay was written by Sarang Jayaprakash and Lijo Panadan from a story by Omar Lulu, and produced by Ousepachan Vaalakuzhy under his production company Ousepachan Movie House. The film features Priya Prakash Varrier and Noorin Shereef with Roshan Abdul Rahoof in the prominent roles.

The story deals with high school romance. The movie gained worldwide attention due to a clip which went viral, from the song "Manikya Malaraya Poovi". It prompted the makers to make changes in script, which delayed production. The film was released on 14 February 2019. It was dubbed and released in Tamil with the same title, in Kannada as Kirik Love Story and in Telugu as Lover's Day.

Plot

The story revolves around the journey of Higher secondary school kids from the time they first meet in class 11 until their passing out in class 12. Roshan woos Priya with the help of Gadha and his other friends. One evening Roshan and his friends get drunk and a friend of Roshan accidentally sends blue film videos from Roshan's phone to the school's WhatsApp group. This causes a rift between Roshan and Priya.

Roshan and Gadha then pretend to be in love to make Priya jealous but they end up having feelings for each other. Priya approaches Roshan and says that she has forgiven him and they can start to be in a relationship again. But Roshan is unable to forget Gadha, which comes to be known by Priya. Heartbroken, she tells Roshan that Gadha can be a perfect partner for him, not Priya and they end their relationship.

On graduation day, Roshan decides to propose Gadha on top of the mountain. Just as Roshan is about to propose to Gadha, they are attacked by a bunch of goons who were antagonized by Roshan and Gadha earlier as part of an eve teasing incident. Gadha is about to be raped and Roshan gets thrashed brutally.
The film ends there while Roshan and Gadha have flashbacks of their lives with each other.

Alternative ending (Reshot)

Just as Roshan is about to propose to Gadha, they are attacked by a bunch of goons who were antagonized by Roshan and Gadha earlier as part of an eve teasing incident. Gadha is about to be raped and Roshan gets thrashed brutally, but fortunately they are saved by their college friends, although Roshan is brutally wounded and Gadha is abused physically still they beat the goons to death. In the ending Roshan and Gadha are seen on a bike and they ride with their friends happily meanwhile Gadha takes mental treatments to overcome the trauma.The couple lives happilly everafter
.

Cast

Principal members of the cast are:
 Priya Prakash Varrier as Priya Varrier
 Noorin Shereef as Gadha John
 Roshan Abdul Rahoof as Roshan
 Aneesh G Menon as Shibu Sir, Maths Teacher(Thallu Shibu)
 Roshna Ann Roy as Sneha Miss, Biology Teacher
 Althaf Salim as Manikandan Sir, Chemistry Teacher
 Shivaji Guruvayoor as School Principal
 Pradeep Kottayam as Principal's Secretary
 Vishnu Govindan as the school peon
 Anjali Nair as English Teacher
 Arun A Kumar as Arun
 Siyadh Shajahan as Francis E. Manavalan
 Mathew Joseph as Mathew
 Vaishak Pavanan as Vishakh Pavanan aka 'Pavanna'
 Hareesh Kanaran as Unmesh Sir, P. T. Teacher
 Siddique as SI Jose Panadan, Gadha's uncle (Cameo)
 Sreejith Ravi as Constable Diwakaran
 Salim Kumar as Manavalan (Cameo)
 Dilruba Aswad Alqamar as Sana
 Michelle Ann Daniel as Michelle
 Suhaid (Kukku) as Akku
 Kalabhavan Niyas as Gadha's father

Production
Filming started on 15 January 2018. Malayalam film producer Ousepachan Vaalakuzhy, impressed with Omar Lulu's Happy Wedding and Chunkzz decided to finance his third project, Oru Adaar Love. The primary cast was selected through audition. Ousepachan Vaalakuzhy said he likes to promote newcomers, as has he done with his previous films. After Priya Prakash Varrier's wink in the song "Manikya Malaraya Poovi" became a viral hit, the makers altered the script to give prominence to her, thus sidelining the role played by Noorin Shereef, who had initially been cast in the lead role.

Music
The film music and score were composed by Shaan Rahman. The song "Manikya Malaraya Poovi" sung by Vineeth Sreenivasan, a revised modern version of a Mappila song, was uploaded on 9 February 2018 on YouTube as part of the promotions. It became a viral video at number 1 position garnering over one million views and 50,000 likes in 20 hours. The original version of "Manikya Malaraya Poovi" was written by P. M. A. Jabbar with music composition by Thalassery K. Refeeque in 1978.

Release
Oru Adaar Love was released on 14 February 2019. It was dubbed in Tamil with the same title, in Kannada as Kirik Love Story and in Telugu as Lover's Day.

Reception

Box office 

Critical reception 
S.R. Praveen of The Hindu stated "Oru Adaar Love on a Valentine’s day seems to be the handiwork of the culture police, for love hardly ever got such a shabby treatment on screen. If only a wink could save this experiment in mediocrity", referring to a scene from a song in the movie where the lead female actor winks, that went viral on the internet before the movie's release.
The Times of India gave 2.5 out of 5 stars, stating: "Oru Adaar Love seems like a quickly put together movie trying to cash in on the rather unexpected publicity that came its way. There are unpredictable twists in the tale, however, that may keep viewers hooked till the end."
India Today gave 2 out of 5 stars, stating: "Oru Adaar Love's lacklustre story and underdeveloped character arcs struggle hard to entertain the audience throughout the film."

The News Minute gave 1 out of 5 stars, stating: "The film appears to say that the wrongs that men do aren’t really all that wrong. The misogyny doesn’t even try to hide behind any ‘larger’ story like in some movies."
Times Now gave 2 out of 5 stars, stating: "The film does no justice to the title but you can watch it to reminisce about your high school days and your first crushes. But when it comes to high school romances, I would still prefer watching Trisha Krishnan-Vijay Sethupathi’s 96."
The Week gave 1 out of 5 stars, stating: "One of the oft used cliches when reviewing a movie is 'old wine in new bottle'. In Omar Lulu's case, he has just a bottle and filled with some water that has the colour of wine."

News18 gave 2 out of 5 stars, stating: "Everything has been planned conveniently to suit a violent ending. What could have turned into an engaging tale of teenage realisation ends up nowhere. It’s a lost opportunity."
The Indian Express gave 2 out of 5 stars, stating: "Oru Adaar Love has no plot as such except for a predictable romantic triangle that plays out between Priya Prakash Varrier, Roshan Abdul Rahoof and Noorin Shereef. The point the film tries to make hasn’t been fleshed out fully to last a two-hour long narration. The entire movie feels like one big set up to achieve a moment that’s fashioned to make the audience sob."
Sify gave 2 out of 5 stars, stating: "Oru Adaar Love provides some unexpected surprises but you would require real patience to sit through until then. It’s a no brainer, often offensive school kid romance that uses every technique to entertain. If that is your idea of fun, you may find this one fine."

References

External links
 
 

2010s Malayalam-language films
Indian romantic comedy films
Films about Indian weddings
Indian teen comedy films
2010s teen comedy films
Indian teen romance films
Films set in schools
2019 romantic comedy films
Films directed by Omar Lulu
Films scored by Shaan Rahman
Films shot in Thrissur